Hermippus of Smyrna was a Greek grammarian and peripatetic philosopher, surnamed by the ancient writers the Callimachian, from which it may be inferred that he was a disciple of Callimachus about the middle of the 3rd century BC, while the fact of his having written about the life of Chrysippus proves that he lived to about the end of the century. His writings seem to have been of very great importance and value. They are repeatedly referred to by the ancient writers, under many titles, of which, however, most, if not all, seem to have been chapters of his great biographical work, which is often quoted under the title of Lives (Bioi). The work contained the biographies of a great many ancient figures, including orators, poets, historians, and philosophers. It contained the earliest known biography of Aristotle, as well as philosophers such as Pythagoras, Empedocles, Heraclitus, Democritus, Zeno, Socrates, Plato, Antisthenes, Diogenes, Stilpo, Epicurus, Theophrastus, Heraclides, Demetrius Phalereus, and Chrysippus. The work has been lost, but many later Lives extensively quote it.

Notes

References
 Felix Jacobi, Die Fragmente der griechischen Historiker continued: Hermippos of Smyrna, Critical edition and English translation of the extant fragments by J. Bollansée, Leiden, Brill, 1999.
 Jan Bollansée, Hermippos of Smyrna and His Biographical Writings. A Reappraisal, Leuven, Peeters, 1999.
 Fritz Wehrli, Hermippos des Kallimacheer, Basel Stuttgart: Schwabe & Co., 1974 (editions of fragments, superseded by Bollansée 1999).

Ancient Greek biographers
Hellenistic-era philosophers from Anatolia
Peripatetic philosophers
3rd-century BC Greek people
3rd-century BC philosophers
Ancient Smyrnaeans
People from İzmir
Philosophers of ancient Ionia